Jimmie "Jim" White (born May 14, 1941, in Sweetwater, Texas) is an American track and field coach, a former high school cross country coach at McFarland High School. From 1987 to 2003, his team won nine state championships in Divisions III and IV, as well as numerous lesser titles.

Personal life 
Jim White is married to Cheryl White and has three daughters: Julie, Jami, and Tami. He started teaching in the McFarland school district after graduating from Pepperdine University in 1964. White taught different subjects at numerous grade levels (fifth-grade science, seventh and eighth-grade wood shop and PE) before starting his coaching career in 1980. During his time as a cross country coach for McFarland, Jim White would follow his team on a bike as his team ran or occasionally ran with them. Although White retired from coaching in 2003, he still visits and participates in practices.

In popular culture

Movies 
In 2015, Walt Disney Pictures released the film McFarland, USA about White and his program, White being portrayed by Kevin Costner.

References

American track and field coaches
Living people
1941 births